"Save It for the Bedroom" is the debut single by British rock band You Me at Six, originally released in 2007. A re-recorded version was released in March 2009. The original recording was produced by Jason Wilson at Stakeout Studios in Hampton.  Wilson recorded all of their early work, helping develop the band's songwriting and performances from the age of 14.

The song is about how couples can tell abnormal behavioural styles of their partner leading to suspicion and then finally realising what has troubled them. In this case, sussing out that a partner has cheated on him/her (as the lyrics suggest). However, there is a mixed story when including the title as it shows a continuation of the relationship, "We'll save it for the bedroom".

The re-recorded version was featured on the soundtrack of Colin McRae: Dirt 2.

Music video
In the music video, the band members are in a Jeremy Kyle type talk show, dressing up as anti-social teenagers and disgruntled members of the public and couples which leads into a fight near the end, that started by the lead singer.

2007 original video
The original music video contains video excerpts of the band on tour, filmed all by a video camera of one of the band members. It features all band members and some touring crew partying and in some scenes has the band on stage playing the song live on separate tour dates. It is believed the footage is from their support tours with Angels & Airwaves, New Found Glory and the Audition.

Track listing
2007 original recording track listing
 "Save It for the Bedroom" – 4:06
 "You've Made Your Bed" – 4:30

2009 re-recorded version track listing
 "Save It for the Bedroom" – 4:14
 "Sweet Feet" – 3:40

Personnel 
 Josh Franceschi - lead vocals
 Chris Miller - lead guitar
 Max Helyer - rhythm guitar / backing vocals
 Matt Barnes - bass
 Dan Flint - drums / percussion

References

2007 songs
2007 debut singles
2009 singles
You Me at Six songs
Songs written by Josh Franceschi